Koiak 9 - Coptic Calendar - Koiak 11

The tenth day of the Coptic month of Koiak, the fourth month of the Coptic year. On a common year, this day corresponds to December 6, of the Julian Calendar, and December 19, of the Gregorian Calendar. This day falls in the Coptic season of Peret, the season of emergence. This day falls in the Nativity Fast.

Commemorations

Saints 

 The martyrdom of Saint Shura of Akhmim 
 The departure of Saint Nicholas, the Bishop of Myra

Other commemorations 

 The relocation of the Body of Saint Severus, the Patriarch of Antioch

References 

Days of the Coptic calendar